Casson is a Native American tribe in central eastern California. Casson may also refer to

 Casson, Loire-Atlantique, a commune in western France
Irving and Casson, a firm of interior designers and furniture makers based in Boston, Massachusetts, U.S.
Casson (name)
Casson handle in mathematics
Casson invariant in mathematics
A. J. Casson Award given to an artist
Diphwys Casson Quarry in Wales